Canolo is a comune (municipality) in the Metropolitan City of Reggio Calabria in the Italian region Calabria, located about  southwest of Catanzaro and about  northeast of Reggio Calabria.

Canolo borders the following municipalities: Agnana Calabra, Cittanova, Gerace, Mammola, San Giorgio Morgeto.

History 
Canolo was believed to be founded in the Byzantine Era by survivors of an attack on Gerace in 952 by the Arabs, but is believed to have been populated long before them after human remains and tools dating as far back as the Neolithic period have been found in the area. During the Bourbon period, surrounding mountains were mined for their deposits of lignite, antimony, barium, and chalk.

References

External links
 Official website

Cities and towns in Calabria